are intra-city expressways which are found in many of Japan's largest urban areas. Due to lack of space many of these expressways are constructed as viaducts running above local roads. The two largest networks are the Shuto Expressway in the Tokyo area and the Hanshin Expressway in the Osaka area. There are other smaller networks in Nagoya, Hiroshima, Kitakyūshū, and Fukuoka. Each network is managed separately from each other (the Fukuoka and Kitakyūshū Expressways are managed by the same company but are not physically connected to each other).

Currently half of the tolled urban expressways operate on a flat-rate toll system (the toll is the same regardless of the distance travelled on the network), however the Shuto Expressway, Hanshin Expressway and Nagoya Expressway have moved to a distance-based toll system for vehicles equipped with ETC. Vehicles travelling on these roads not equipped with ETC, must now pay the maximum toll achievable from the entrance the vehicle enters from.

Urban Expressways in Japan
Shuto Expressway
Tokyo Expressway (Interconnected to the Shuto Expressway on both ends. Toll free.)
Hanshin Expressway
Nagoya Expressway
Fukuoka Expressway
Hiroshima Expressway
Kitakyūshū Expressway

References

External links
Official website
Ministry of Land, Infrastructure and Transport, Road Bureau 
Map of expressway routes 
全国の高速道路ガイド　

Expressways in Japan
Lists of roads in Japan